The Finnish Declaration of Independence was adopted by the Parliament of Finland on 6 December 1917. It declared Finland an independent nation, ending its autonomy within Russia as the Grand Principality of Finland, with reference to a bill simultaneously delivered to the Parliament to make Finland an independent republic instead.

Declaring independence was only part of the long process leading to the independence of Finland. The declaration is celebrated as Independence Day in Finland.

History

Revolution in Russia

After the February Revolution and the abdication of Tsar Nicholas II, Grand Prince of Finland, on 2 March (15 March N.S.) 1917, the personal union between Russia and Finland lost its legal base – at least according to the view in Helsinki. There were negotiations between the Russian Provisional Government and Finnish authorities.

The resulting proposal, approved by the Provisional Government, was heavily rewritten in the Eduskunta (Finnish Parliament) and transformed into the so-called Power Act (Finnish: Valtalaki, Swedish: Maktlagen), whereby the Parliament declared itself to now hold all powers of legislation, except with respect to foreign policy and military issues, and also that it could be dissolved only by itself. At the time of the vote, it was believed that the Provisional Government would be quickly defeated by the rebellion in Saint Petersburg. The Provisional Government survived, however, disapproved of the Power Act and dissolved the Parliament.

After new elections and the ultimate defeat of the Provisional Government in the October Revolution, the Finnish Parliament decided to set a three-man regency council, based on Finland's Constitution, and more precisely on clause §38 of the old Instrument of Government of 1772, which had been enacted by the Estates after Gustav III's bloodless coup. This paragraph provided for the election of a new monarch in case of the extinction of the royal line and was interpreted in Finland as vesting sovereignty in the estates, later the Parliament, in such an interregnum. The regency council was never elected, because of the strong opposition of Finnish socialists and their general strike which demanded for more radical action.

On 2 November (15 November N.S.) 1917, the Bolsheviks declared a general right of self-determination, including the right of complete secession, "for the Peoples of Russia". On the same day the Finnish Parliament issued a declaration by which it assumed, pro tempore, all powers of the Sovereign in Finland.

The old Instrument of Government was however no longer deemed suitable. Leading circles had long held monarchism and hereditary nobility to be antiquated, and advocated a republican constitution for Finland.

Independence

The Senate of Finland, the government that the Parliament had appointed in November, drafted a Declaration of Independence and a proposal for a new republican Instrument of Government. Chairman of the Senate ( Prime minister) Pehr Evind Svinhufvud read the Declaration to the Parliament on 4 December. The Declaration of Independence was technically given the form of a preamble of the proposition, and was intended to be agreed by the Parliament, which adopted the Declaration on 6 December.

On 18 December (31 December N. S.) the Soviet Russian government issued a Decree, recognising Finland's independence, and on 22 December (4 January 1918 N. S.) it was approved by the highest Soviet executive body, the All-Russian Central Executive Committee (VTsIK).

The Declaration and 15 November

With reference to the declaration of 15 November, the declaration says:
The people of Finland have by this step taken their fate in their own hands; a step both justified and demanded by present conditions. The people of Finland feel deeply that they cannot fulfil their national and international duty without complete sovereignty. The century-old desire for freedom awaits fulfilment now; Finland's people step forward as a free nation among the other nations in the world.

(...) The people of Finland dare to confidently await how other nations in the world recognize that with their full independence and freedom, the people of Finland can do their best in fulfilment of those purposes that will win them a place amongst civilized peoples.

Context
Estonia, Latvia, and Lithuania declared their independence from Russia during the same period. See Estonian War of Independence, Latvian Independence and Lithuanian Wars of Independence.

These three countries were occupied by, and annexed into, the Soviet Union (1940–1941, 1944–1991). See Occupation of the Baltic states.

Text of Finland's Declaration of Independence

The Finnish Senate:

International recognition

See also
 History of Finland
 Independence of Finland
 Politics of Finland
 Russification of Finland

References

External links

Declaration of independence (Finnish) from Wikisource
Declaration of independence (Swedish) from Wikisource
Instrument of Government (Swedish) from Wikisource
Audio recording of Svinhufvud reading the speech in 1937 from YLE

Declarations of independence
Political history of Finland
1917 in Finland
Finland–Russia relations
Separatism in Russia
December 1917 events
1917 documents
1917 in politics
Dissolution of the Russian Empire